Asota strigosa is a moth of the family Erebidae first described by Jean Baptiste Boisduval in 1832. It is found in Indonesia and the Papua New Guinea.

Its wingspan is generally around 53 mm.

References

Asota (moth)
Moths of Indonesia
Moths of New Guinea
Moths described in 1832